Ulmus 'Revera' is an American hybrid cultivar raised by the Wisconsin Alumni Research Foundation (WARF) as selection '1193-3' which, like 'Reperta', was derived from a crossing of 'Regal' (female parent) with a crossing of Ulmus rubra and the hybrid Ulmus pumila × Ulmus davidiana var. japonica.

Description
Not available.

Pests and diseases
'Revera' has a resistance to Dutch elm disease.

Cultivation
The tree was registered in 1993 as 'Revera' by Conrad Appel KG, of Darmstadt, Germany, but has yet to be commercially released in either the United States or Europe.

Accessions
Not known.

References

Hybrid elm cultivar
Ulmus articles missing images
Ulmus